Saul Phillips is the name of:

Saúl Phillips (born 1984), Costa Rican footballer
Saul Phillips (basketball) (born 1972), American college basketball head coach and former player